Sir George Warrender of Lochend, 4th Baronet, PC, FRS, FRSE (5 December 1782 – 21 February 1849) was a Scottish politician. In 1799, he succeeded to his father's baronetcy. Due to his lifestyle, he was nicknamed Sir Gorge Provender.

Life

Born in Dunbar, he was the son of Lieutenant-Colonel Sir Patrick Warrender, 3rd Baronet and H. Blair. Warrender was educated at Christ Church, Oxford, where he matriculated in 1799 and at Trinity College, Cambridge, where he graduated with an MA in 1811. He served in the Berwickshire militia, reaching the rank of lieutenant-colonel.

Warrender was Member of Parliament (MP) for Haddington Burghs from 1807 to 1812 and for Truro from 1812 to 1818. He was further Member of Parliament for Sandwich from 1818 to 1826, for Westbury from 1826 to 1830, as well as for Honiton from 1830 to 1832.

Between 1812 and 1822, Warrender was Lord of the Admiralty and between 1822 and 1828, Commissioner of the Board of Control. On 4 February 1822, he was sworn of the Privy Council. 

On 3 October 1810, he married Hon. Anne Evelyn Boscawen, daughter of the 3rd Viscount Falmouth in St James's in Westminster. Their marriage was childless and unhappy.

He was elected a Fellow of the Royal Society in 1815 and a Fellow of the Royal Society of Edinburgh in 1823, his proposer being Sir Henry Jardine.

In the 1830s he was living at 625 Castlehill at the top of the Royal Mile in Edinburgh.

He died in Upper Berkeley Street in London on 21 February 1849 aged 66, and was succeeded by his younger brother John Warrender.

References

External links 

 

1782 births
1849 deaths
Alumni of Christ Church, Oxford
Alumni of Trinity College, Cambridge
Baronets in the Baronetage of Great Britain
British Militia officers
Fellows of the Royal Society
Lords of the Admiralty
Members of the Privy Council of the United Kingdom
Members of the Parliament of the United Kingdom for Honiton
Members of the Parliament of the United Kingdom for Scottish constituencies
Members of the Parliament of the United Kingdom for constituencies in Cornwall
UK MPs 1807–1812
UK MPs 1812–1818
UK MPs 1818–1820
UK MPs 1820–1826
UK MPs 1826–1830
UK MPs 1830–1831
UK MPs 1831–1832
People from Dunbar